John Muir (1838–1914) was a Scottish-born American environmentalist and author.

John Muir may also refer to:

People 
 John Muir (indologist) (1810–1882), British linguist
 John Muir (businessman) (1828-1903), Scottish businessman, founder of Finlay Muir & Co, and Lord Provost of Glasgow
 John Ramsay Muir (1872–1941), British Member of Parliament
 John Muir (South African naturalist) (1874–1947), Scottish-born South African physician, naturalist and historian
 John Muir (trade unionist) (1879–1931), British journalist and Member of Parliament
 John Muir (footballer, born 1903), Scottish footballer
 John Muir (engineer) (1918–1977), American engineer and author
 John Muir (footballer, born 1947), Scottish footballer
 John Kenneth Muir (born 1969), American author
 John Muir (judge) (fl. c. 2000), judge on the Supreme Court of Queensland, Australia

Other uses
 John Muir College, an undergraduate college of the University of California, San Diego
 "John Muir", a song by Schoolboy Q from Blank Face LP

See also 
 John Muir Award (disambiguation)
 John Muir Branch Library, Los Angeles
 John Muir Country Park, East Lothian, Scotland
 John Muir Health, a health care service
 John Muir National Historic Site, in the San Francisco Bay area, California
 John Muir Parkway, part of California State Route 4
 John Muir Publications, an American publisher best known for publishing Rick Steves, acquired by Avalon Publishing Group
 John Muir Trail, California
 John Muir Trail (Tennessee)
 John Muir Trust, a Scottish charity
 John Muir Way, a coastal path in East Lothian
 John Muir Wilderness, California
 Muir Middle School (disambiguation)

Muir, John